Dennisiella is a genus of fungi in the family Coccodiniaceae. It has 9 species. The genus was circumscribed by mycologists Augusto Chaves Batista and Raffaele Ciferri in 1962, with Dennisiella babingtonii designated as the type species. The generic name honours British mycologist R. W. G. Dennis. Fungi in this genus are epifoliar; that is, they live on living plant surfaces, particularly leaves.

Species
Dennisiella asetosa  – Australia
Dennisiella babingtonii 
Dennisiella caucasica 
Dennisiella coussapoae  – Brazil (host: Coussapoa floccosa)
Dennisiella ekmanii 
Dennisiella fusispora  – Australia
Dennisiella longispora  – Cuba (host: Zanthoxylum martinicense)
Dennisiella setosa 
Dennisiella theae

References

Eurotiomycetes
Eurotiomycetes genera
Taxa described in 1962